Billy Callender (5 January 1903 – 26 July 1932) was an English professional footballer who played as a goalkeeper. He made 202 Football League appearances for Crystal Palace between 1923 and 1932.

Callender was born in Prudhoe, Northumberland and was playing in local football with Prudhoe Town when he was signed by Crystal Palace in 1923. Initially, he was understudy to Jack Alderson and made only two appearances in his first two seasons at the club. He became a regular in the 1925–26 season and was ever-present in 1926–27, when he also played for the Football League representative team. Callender continued to be a regular in the Crystal Palace team until the end of the 1931–32 season.

On 26 July 1932, Callender committed suicide at the club ground, following the death of his fiancée from polio. He was found hanged in the team dressing room after training.

References

External links
Billy Callender at holmesdale.net

1903 births
1932 suicides
People from Prudhoe
Footballers from Northumberland
English footballers
English Football League players
Association football goalkeepers
Crystal Palace F.C. players
English Football League representative players
Suicides by hanging in England